New Mathematics and Natural Computation is an interdisciplinary journal founded in 2005 and is now published by World Scientific. It covers mathematical uncertainty and its applications to computational, biological and social sciences, with a specific focus on relatively unexplored areas in mathematical uncertainty, such as fuzzy sets and fuzzy logic.

Abstracting and indexing 
The journal is abstracted and indexed in:
 Mathematical Reviews
 Zentralblatt MATH
As of 2013, it had a SCImago Journal Rank in the bottom quartile of journals in applied and computational mathematics, computer science applications, and human-computer interaction.

References

External links 
 Journal Website

World Scientific academic journals
Mathematics journals
Publications established in 2005
English-language journals